Cai Shenxi (February 12, 1906 – October 9, 1932) was a general officer in the Chinese Workers' and Peasants' Red Army during the Chinese Civil War. He was born in Liling, Hunan. He joined the Communist Party of China in 1924. In 1926, he participated in the Northern Expedition. In August 1927, he participated in the Nanchang Uprising. He fought against the Kuomintang at Sanhe, Dabu County, Guangdong. In December 1927, he participated in the Guangzhou Uprising. He led the attack on Xiajiang County, Jiangxi in November 1929. He was killed in action in Hong'an County, Hubei.

References

1906 births
1932 deaths
Chinese Red Army generals
Military personnel killed in action during the Republic of China era
People from Liling
Generals from Hunan